Yngve Karlsen (28 February 1930 – 5 October 2010) was a Norwegian footballer. He played in three matches for the Norway national football team from 1953 to 1957. He was also named in Norway's squad for the Group 1 qualification tournament for the 1954 FIFA World Cup.

References

1930 births
2010 deaths
Norwegian footballers
Norway international footballers
Place of birth missing
Association footballers not categorized by position